Orochs (Russian О́рочи), Orochons, or Orochis (self-designation: Nani) are a people of Russia that speak the Oroch (Orochon) language of the Southern group of Tungusic languages. According to the 2002 census there were 686 Orochs in Russia. According to the 2010 census there were 596 Orochs in Russia.

Orochs traditionally settled in the southern part of the Khabarovsk Krai, Russia and on the Amur and Kopp rivers. In the 19th century, some of them migrated to Sakhalin. In the early 1930s, the Orochi National District was created, but was cancelled shortly thereafter "due to lack of native population".

Because the people never had a written language, they were educated in the Russian language. Their language, Oroch, is on the verge of extinction. They follow Shamanism, the Russian Orthodox Church, and Buddhism.

History 
Between 1963 and 1993, major changes took place in Oroch families:
 Almost all Orochi marriages became inter-ethnic - in 1951-1955, 73% of Orochi marriages were mono-ethnic, and in 1991-1995 only 9%.
 The share of Oroch-Russian marriages increased sharply from 9% in 1951-1955 to 82% in 1991-1995.
 The maximum size of an Oroch family decreased from 10 to 7 people from 1963 to 1993.
 The average family size of the Orochi in 1993 was 2.9 people, compared to 4.8 in 1963.

References

External links 
 
 The Orochis in The Red Book of the Peoples of the Russian Empire
 Ethnologue link

Ethnic groups in Russia
Tungusic peoples
Indigenous peoples of North Asia
Khabarovsk Krai
Indigenous small-numbered peoples of the North, Siberia and the Far East
Indigenous peoples in the Arctic